Ron Montez was a professional ballroom dance champion and choreographer who won the professional Latin division of the U.S. Dancesport Championships from 1979 to 1985.

He died of COVID-19 on January 24, 2021.

See also 
 U.S. National Dancesport Champions (Professional Latin)
 So You Think You Can Dance (Season 3)
 America's Ballroom Challenge

References 

American choreographers
So You Think You Can Dance choreographers